Solano Town Center, formerly Westfield Solano and Solano Mall, and colloquially known as the Fairfield Mall, is a shopping mall in Fairfield, California, United States, with over 125 stores, multiple restaurants and dining options. The mall is located on Travis Boulevard, one block east of I-80 off the Travis Boulevard exit. Solano Town Center is owned by Starwood Retail Partners and is leased and managed by Spinoso Real Estate Group.

History 
Solano Town Center opened in 1981 as Solano Mall with original anchors The Emporium, JCPenney and Sears.

Westfield America, Inc., a precursor to the Westfield Group, acquired the shopping center in 1998 and renamed it Westfield Shoppingtown Solano, dropping the "Shoppingtown" name in June 2005. In April 2012, The Westfield Group sold the establishment to Starwood Capital Group. In November 2012, the name changed again to Solano Town Center.

Mervyn's was the mall's fifth anchor store until they went out of business in 2008. Forever 21 moved into the upper level of the former Mervyn's in 2010. Sports Authority moved into the lower level of the former Mervyn's in 2011, which closed when that chain went out of business in 2016. The space has since been taken by Dick's Sporting Goods in 2017. In 2015, Sears Holdings spun off 235 of its properties, including the Sears at Solano Town Center, into Seritage Growth Properties. Sears closed its location in July 2018. In early 2020, Dave & Buster's was slated to open a brand-new restaurant in a portion of the former Sears space, but construction was delayed due to the COVID-19 pandemic. The restaurant finally opened in 2021.

Anchors
Its anchor stores are JCPenney, Macy's, Best Buy and Dick's Sporting Goods. There is also an Edwards Cinemas IMAX multiplex located above the Best Buy anchor.

Current
Dick's Sporting Goods (lower level)
Macy's
J. C. Penney
Best Buy (lower level)
Edwards Cinema
Dave & Buster's

Former
The Emporium - First became Macy's Clearence Center until it closed in 1997 and was replaced with a newly-relocated Sears in 1998.
Forever 21 - Closed in 2020.
Mervyns - Closed in 2008. Replaced with Forever 21 in 2010 (upper level) and Sports Authority (lower level) in 2011.
Sports Authority - Closed in 2016. Replaced with Dick's Sporting Goods in 2017.
Sears - Original space replaced with Edwards Cinema (upper level) in 1999 and Best Buy (lower level) in 2000. The store moved to the former Emporium space in 1998 and closed in 2018.

References

External links
Official Solano Town Center website

Shopping malls in the San Francisco Bay Area
Buildings and structures in Solano County, California
Tourist attractions in Solano County, California
Shopping malls established in 1981
Fairfield, California
1981 establishments in California